is a former Japanese football player.

Playing career
Kato was born in Shizuoka Prefecture on April 10, 1976. After graduating from Shimizu Commercial High School, he joined Nagoya Grampus Eight in 1995. Although he played several matches until 1996, he could hardly play in the match. He retired end of 1997 season.

Club statistics

References

External links

1976 births
Living people
Association football people from Shizuoka Prefecture
Japanese footballers
J1 League players
Nagoya Grampus players
Association football defenders